The following list of mantis genera and species is based on the "Mantodea Species File", which is the primary reference for the taxonomy shown here.

The insect order Mantodea consists of over 2,400 species of mantises in about 460 genera. 75 of these genera are in the family Mantidae (the mantids), which formerly was sole family recognized within the order.

In some cases, common names in the English language are loosely applied to several different members of a particular genus, or even for species in various genera. For example, "giant Asian mantis" is used for various members of Hierodula, "dead leaf mantis" may refer not only to various species of Deroplatys, but to all brown mantises that use leaf mimicry for camouflage. "flower mantis" refers to numerous mantises, especially those belonging to or similar to those of genus Creobroter, and so on.

---For citation of common nomenclature and additional references, see individual articles.

Genus Acanthops
Some members of this genus are known as dead leaf mantises or boxer mantises.
 
Acanthops bidens
Acanthops boliviana 
Acanthops brunneri 
Acanthops centralis 
Acanthops coloradensis 
Acanthops contorta 
Acanthops elegans 
Acanthops erosa 
Acanthops erosula 
Acanthops falcata 
Acanthops falcataria 
Acanthops fuscifolia 
Acanthops godmani 
Acanthops occidentalis
Acanthops onorei
Acanthops parafalcata 
Acanthops parva 
Acanthops royi 
Acanthops soukana

Genus Achlaena
Achlaena grandis

Genus Achlaenella
Achlaenella adolphifrederici

Genus Acithespis
Acithespis gigas

Genus Acontista

Acontista amazonica
Acontista amoenula
Acontista aurantiaca
Acontista bolivari
Acontista brevipennis
Acontista cayennensis
Acontista championi
Acontista chopardi
Acontista concinna
Acontista cordillerae
Acontista cubana
Acontista ecuadorica
Acontista eximia
Acontista festae
Acontista fraterna
Acontista gracilis
Acontista inquinata
Acontista iriodes
Acontista maroniensis
Acontista mexicana
Acontista minima
Acontista multicolor
Acontista parva
Acontista piracicabensis
Acontista rehni
Acontista semirufa
Acontista vitrea

Genus Acromantis
Some species within this genus are known as boxer mantises or flower mantises.

Acromantis australis 
Acromantis dyaka 
Acromantis elegans 
Acromantis formosana (Taiwan flower mantis)
Acromantis gestri (Thai boxer mantis, Sumatran Acromantis)
Acromantis grandis
Acromantis hesione 
Acromantis indica 
Acromantis insularis 
Acromantis japonica (Japanese boxer mantis)
Acromantis lilii 
Acromantis luzonica 
Acromantis montana 
Acromantis moultoni 
Acromantis nicobarica 
Acromantis oligoneura 
Acromantis palauana 
Acromantis philippina 
Acromantis satsumensis 
Acromantis siporana

Genus Aetaella
Aetaella bakeri 
Aetaella pluvisilvae

Genus Aethalochroa

Members of this genus are commonly called stick mantises.
Aethalochroa affinis
Aethalochroa ashmoliana (Iranian stick mantis)
Aethalochroa indica
Aethalochroa insignis (Indian stick mantis)
Aethalochroa simplicipes
Aethalochroa spinipes

Genus Afrothespis
Afrothespis kenyana
Afrothespis rhodesiaca

Genus Agrionopsis
Agrionopsis bacilliformis
Agrionopsis brachyptera
Agrionopsis congica
Agrionopsis distanti
Agrionopsis modesta

Genus Alalomantis
Alalomantis coxalis
Alalomantis muta (Cameroon mantis)

Genus Alangularis
Alangularis multilobata

Genus Amantis
Amantis aeta
Amantis aliena
Amantis basilana
Amantis biroi
Amantis bolivari
Amantis fuliginosa
Amantis fumosana
Amantis gestri
Amantis hainanensis
Amantis indica
Amantis irina
Amantis lofaoshanensis
Amantis longipennis
Amantis malayana
Amantis nawai
Amantis philippina
Amantis reticulata
Amantis saussurei
Amantis subirina
Amantis testacea
Amantis tristis
Amantis vitalisi

Genus †Ambermantis
†Ambermantis wozniaki

Genus Ambivia
Ambivia parapopa
Ambivia popa

Genus Ameles

Ameles abjecta
Ameles aegyptiaca
Ameles africana
Ameles arabica
Ameles assoi 
Ameles crassinervis
Ameles decolor 
Ameles dumonti 
†Ameles fasciipennis 
Ameles gracilis 
Ameles heldreichi 
Ameles kervillei 
Ameles maroccana 
Ameles massai 
Ameles modesta 
Ameles moralesi
Ameles nana 
Ameles persa 
Ameles picteti 
Ameles poggii 
Ameles soror 
Ameles spallanzania (European dwarf mantis)
Ameles syriensis
Ameles wadisirhani

Genus Amorphoscelis

Amorphoscelis species are concentrated in Africa, India, Indonesia, and the Philippines.
Amorphoscelis abyssinica
Amorphoscelis angolica
Amorphoscelis annulicornis
Amorphoscelis asymmetrica
Amorphoscelis austrogermanica
Amorphoscelis bimaculata
Amorphoscelis borneana
Amorphoscelis brunneipennis
Amorphoscelis chinensis
Amorphoscelis chopardi
Amorphoscelis elegans
Amorphoscelis griffini
Amorphoscelis grisea
Amorphoscelis hainana
Amorphoscelis hamata
Amorphoscelis huismani
Amorphoscelis javana
Amorphoscelis kenyensis
Amorphoscelis lamottei
Amorphoscelis laxeretis
Amorphoscelis machadoi
Amorphoscelis morini
Amorphoscelis naumanni
Amorphoscelis nigriventer
Amorphoscelis nubeculosa
Amorphoscelis opaca
Amorphoscelis orientalis
Amorphoscelis pallida
Amorphoscelis pantherina
Amorphoscelis papua
Amorphoscelis parva
Amorphoscelis pellucida
Amorphoscelis phaesoma
Amorphoscelis philippina
Amorphoscelis pinheyi
Amorphoscelis pulchella
Amorphoscelis pulchra
Amorphoscelis punctata
Amorphoscelis reticulata
Amorphoscelis rufula
Amorphoscelis siebersi
Amorphoscelis singaporana
Amorphoscelis spinosa
Amorphoscelis stellulatha
Amorphoscelis subnigra
Amorphoscelis sulawesiana
Amorphoscelis sumatrana
Amorphoscelis tigrina
Amorphoscelis tuberculata
Amorphoscelis villiersi

Genus †Amorphoscelites
†Amorphoscelites sharovi

Genus Amphecostephanus
Amphecostephanus rex

Genus Anamiopteryx
Anamiopteryx borellii
Anamiopteryx grandis
Anamiopteryx magna
Anamiopteryx tuberculata

Genus Anaxarcha
Anaxarcha acuta
Anaxarcha graminea
Anaxarcha hyalina
Anaxarcha intermedia
Anaxarcha limbata
Anaxarcha pulchella
Anaxarcha pulchra
Anaxarcha sinensis
Anaxarcha tianmushanensis
Anaxarcha zhengi

Genus Angela
 Angela armata
 Angela brachyptera
 Angela championi
 Angela decolor
 Angela guianensis (Rehn, 1906) 
 Angela inermis 
 Angela lemoulti
 Angela maxima
 Angela minor 
 Angela miranda
 Angela ornata
 Angela perpulchra
 Angela peruviana
 Angela purpurascens
 Angela quinquemaculata
 Angela saussurii
 Angela subhyalina
 Angela trifasciata 
 Angela werneri

Genus Anoplosigerpes
Anoplosigerpes tessmanni

Genus Antemna
Antemna rapax

Genus Antistia
Antistia maculipennis
Antistia parva
Antistia robusta
Antistia vicina

Genus Anasigerpes
Anasigerpes amieti
Anasigerpes bifasciata
Anasigerpes centralis
Anasigerpes grilloti
Anasigerpes heydeni
Anasigerpes nigripes
Anasigerpes trifasciata
Anasigerpes unifasciata

Genus Apterocorypha
Apterocorypha atra
Apterocorypha aurita
Apterocorypha bispina
Apterocorypha somalica

Genus Apteromantis

Apteromantis aptera
Apteromantis bolivari

Genus †Aragonimantis
†Aragonimantis aenigma

Genus †Archaeophlebia
†Archaeophlebia enigmatica

Genus Archimantis

Archimantis species are common in Australia. Some are called stick mantises.
Archimantis armata
Archimantis brunneriana
Archimantis gracilis
Archimantis latistyla (large brown mantis, Australian stick mantis)
Archimantis monstrosa (monster mantis)
Archimantis quinquelobata
Archimantis sobrina
Archimantis straminea
Archimantis vittata

Genus Ariusia

Ariusia conspersa

Genus Armene
Armene breviptera
Armene fanica
Armene griseolata
Armene hissarica
Armene pusilla
Armene robusta
Armene silvicola

Genus Armeniola
Armeniola laevis

Genus Arria
Arria cinctipes
Arria leigongshanensis
Arria meghalayensis
Arria oreophila
Arria pallida
Arria sticta

Genus †Arvernineura
†Arvernineura insignis

Genus Asiadodis
Members of this genus are common known as shield mantises.
Asiadodis squilla (Asian shield mantis)
Asiadodis yunnanensis

Genus Astape

Astape denticollis

Genus Astollia
Astollia chloris

Genus Astyliasula
Astyliasula basinigra
Astyliasula hoffmanni
Astyliasula inermis
Astyliasula javana
Astyliasula major
Astyliasula phyllopus
Astyliasula sarawaca
Astyliasula wuyshana

Genus Austromantis
Austromantis albomarginata

Genus Austrovates
Austrovates papua
Austrovates variegata

Genus † Baissomantis
 † Baissomantis maculata Gratshev & Zherikhin, 1994
 † Baissomantis picta Gratshev & Zherikhin, 1994

Genus Bantia

Bantia chopardi
Bantia fusca
Bantia marmorata
Bantia metzi
Bantia michaelisi
Bantia nana
Bantia pygmaea
Bantia simoni
Bantia werneri
Bantia yotocoensis

Genus Bantiella

Bantiella columbina
Bantiella fusca
Bantiella hyalina
Bantiella pallida
Bantiella trinitatis

Genus Belomantis
Belomantis helenae
Belomantis mirei
Belomantis occidentalis

Genus Betamantis
Betamantis aliena
Betamantis marginella

Genus Bimantis
Bimantis malaccana

Genus Bistanta

Bistanta mexicana

Genus Bisanthe
Bisanthe lagrecai
Bisanthe menyharthi
Bisanthe modesta
Bisanthe pulchripennis
Bisanthe tricolor

Genus Blepharodes

Blepharodes candelarius
Blepharodes cornutus
Blepharodes parumspinosus
Blepharodes sudanensis

Genus Blepharopsis
Blepharopsis mendica (Egyptian flower mantis, thistle mantis)

Genus Bolbe
Bolbe lowi
Bolbe maia 
Bolbe nigra 
Bolbe pallida
Bolbe pygmaea

Genus Bolbella
Bolbella affinis
Bolbella brevis
Bolbella kaltenbachi
Bolbella punctigera
Bolbella rhodesiaca
Bolbella uhligi

Genus Bolbena
Bolbena assimilis
Bolbena hottentotta
Bolbena maraisi
Bolbena minor
Bolbena orientalis
Bolbena minutissima

Genus Bolbula
Bolbula debilis
Bolbula exigua
Bolbula widenmanni

Genus Bolivaria
Bolivaria amnicola
Bolivaria brachyptera
Bolivaria kurda

Genus Bolivaroscelis
Bolivaroscelis bolivarii
Bolivaroscelis carinata
Bolivaroscelis werneri

Genus Brunneria
Brunneria, species of which are known as stick mantises, are found in North America, Central America, and South America.
Brunneria borealis (Brunner's mantis, Brunner's stick mantis, American stick mantis)
Brunneria brasiliensis (Brazilian stick mantis)
Brunneria gracilis
Brunneria grandis
Brunneria longa
Brunneria subaptera (small-winged stick mantis)

Genus Brancsikia
Brancsikia aeroplana (Lamberton, 1911)
Brancsikia freyi (Brancsik, 1893)

Genus †Burmantis
†Burmantis asiatica
†Burmantis lebanensis
†Burmantis zherikhini

Genus Calamothespis
Calamothespis adusta
Calamothespis aspoeckorum
Calamothespis condamini
Calamothespis congica
Calamothespis guineensis
Calamothespis kibweziana
Calamothespis lesnei
Calamothespis lineatipennis
Calamothespis nathani
Calamothespis oxyops
Calamothespis prosti
Calamothespis rourei
Calamothespis subcornuta
Calamothespis tanzaniensis
Calamothespis taylori
Calamothespis vansoni
Calamothespis vuattouxi

Genus Caliris
Caliris elegans
Caliris masoni
Caliris melli
Caliris pallens
Caliris pallida

Genus Callibia
Callibia diana

Genus Callimantis
Callimantis antillarum

Genus Callivates
Callivates stephanei

Genus Calofulcinia
Calofulcinia australis
Calofulcinia elegans
Calofulcinia integra
Calofulcinia oxynota
Calofulcinia paraoxypila
Calofulcinia vidua
Calofulcinia viridula

Genus Camelomantis
Camelomantis giraffa
Camelomantis gracillima
Camelomantis moultoni
Camelomantis parva
Camelomantis penangica
Camelomantis sondaica
Camelomantis sumatrana

Genus Cardioptera
Cardioptera brachyptera
Cardioptera minor
Cardioptera nigridens
Cardioptera parva
Cardioptera squalodon

Genus Carrikerella
Carrikerella ceratophora
Carrikerella empusa
Carrikerella simpira

Genus Carvilia
Carvilia gracilis
Carvilia obscura
Carvilia saussurii

Genus Cataspilota
Cataspilota armicollis
Cataspilota calabarica
Cataspilota guineensis
Cataspilota lolodorfana
Cataspilota misana
Cataspilota pulchra
Cataspilota tristis

Genus Catestiasula
Catestiasula moultoni
Catestiasula nitida
Catestiasula seminigra

Genus Catoxyopsis
Catoxyopsis dubiosa

Genus Caudatoscelis
Caudatoscelis annulipes
Caudatoscelis caudata
Caudatoscelis collarti
Caudatoscelis lagrecai
Caudatoscelis marmorata

Genus Ceratocrania
Ceratocrania macra
Ceratocrania malayae

Genus Ceratomantis
 Ceratomantis ghatei
 Ceratomantis gigliotosi
 Ceratomantis kimberlae
 Ceratomantis saussurii
 Ceratomantis yunnanensis

Genus Chaeteessa
†Chaeteessa brevialata
Chaeteessa burmeisteri
Chaeteessa caudata
Chaeteessa filata
Chaeteessa nana
Chaeteessa nigromarginata
Chaeteessa valida

Genus †Chaeteessites
†Chaeteessites minutissimus

Genus Charieis
Charieis peeli

Genus Chlidonoptera

Chlidonoptera chopardi
Chlidonoptera lestoni
Chlidonoptera roxanae
Chlidonoptera vexillum
Chlidonoptera werneri

Genus Chlorocalis
Chlorocalis maternaschulzei
Chlorocalis prasina

Genus Chloroharpax
Chloroharpax modesta (Nigerian flower mantis)

Genus Chloromantis
Chloromantis impunctata
Chloromantis rhombica

Genus Chloromiopteryx
Chloromiopteryx mirim
Chloromiopteryx modesta
Chloromiopteryx plurilobata
Chloromiopteryx thalassina

Genus Choeradodis
Members of this genus are commonly known as shield mantises, hooded mantises, or leaf mantises.
Choeradodis columbica (Columbian shield mantis)
Choeradodis rhombicollis (Peruvian shield mantis)
Choeradodis rhomboidea (tropical shield mantis, Hooded mantis, leaf mantis)
Choeradodis stalii (tropical shield mantis, Hooded mantis, leaf mantis)
Choeradodis strumaria (leaf mantis)

Genus Chopardempusa
Chopardempusa neglecta

Genus Chopardentella
Chopardentella royi

Genus Chopardiella
Chopardiella heterogamia
Chopardiella latipennis
Chopardiella poulaini

Genus Chroicoptera
Chroicoptera longa
Chroicoptera saussurei
Chroicoptera vidua

Genus Chromatophotina
Chromatophotina awajun
Chromatophotina cofan

Genus Chrysomantis
Chrysomantis cachani
Chrysomantis congica
Chrysomantis girardi
Chrysomantis royi
Chrysomantis speciosa
Chrysomantis tessmanni

Genus Cilnia

Cilnia chopardi
Cilnia humeralis (wide-armed mantis)

Genus Citharomantis
Citharomantis falcata

Genus Ciulfina
Ciulfina annecharlotteae
Ciulfina baldersoni
Ciulfina biseriata
Ciulfina herbersteinae
Ciulfina ianrichardi 
Ciulfina klassi
Ciulfina liturgusa
Ciulfina rentzi
Ciulfina terrymariceae

Genus Cliomantis

Cliomantis cornuta
Cliomantis dispar
Cliomantis lateralis
Cliomantis obscura

Genus Coenomantis
Coenomantis kraussiana

Genus Compsomantis
Compsomantis ceylonica
Compsomantis crassiceps
Compsomantis mindoroensis
Compsomantis robusta
Compsomantis semirufula
Compsomantis tumidiceps

Genus Compsothespis
Compsothespis abyssinica
Compsothespis anomala
Compsothespis australiensis
Compsothespis brevipennis
Compsothespis cinnabarina
Compsothespis ebneri
Compsothespis falcifera
Compsothespis hispida
Compsothespis kilwana
Compsothespis marginipennis
Compsothespis michaelseni
Compsothespis natalica
Compsothespis occidentalis
Compsothespis zavattarii

Genus Congoharpax
Congoharpax aberrans 
Congoharpax boulardi 
Congoharpax coiffaiti 
Congoharpax judithae

Genus Congomantis
Congomantis femoralis

Genus Coptopteryx
Coptopteryx argentina
Coptopteryx claraziana
Coptopteryx constricta
Coptopteryx gayi
Coptopteryx gracilis
Coptopteryx grisea
Coptopteryx inermis
Coptopteryx magna
Coptopteryx mesomelas
Coptopteryx minuta
Coptopteryx parva
Coptopteryx platana
Coptopteryx pusilla
Coptopteryx rebrevipennis
Coptopteryx spinosa
Coptopteryx thoracica
Coptopteryx thoracoides 
Coptopteryx viridis

Genus Cornucollis
Cornucollis masoalensis

Genus Corthylomantis
Corthylomantis baldersoni

Genus Corticomantis
Corticomantis atricoxata

Genus Cotigaonopsis
Cotigaonopsis providenceae

Genus Creobroter
With their wings adorned with patterns even when at rest, Creobroter, a genus concentrated in Western Asia, is one of the best-known genera to which the common name "flower mantis" is applied. 
Creobroter apicalis 
Creobroter celebensis 
Creobroter discifera 
Creobroter episcopalis
Creobroter fasciatus 
Creobroter fuscoareatus
Creobroter gemmatus (jeweled flower mantis, Indian flower mantis)
Creobroter granulicollis
Creobroter insolitus 
Creobroter jiangxiensis 
Creobroter labuanae 
Creobroter laevicollis
Creobroter medanus 
Creobroter meleagris
Creobroter nebulosa
Creobroter pictipennis (Indian flower mantis)
Creobroter signifer
Creobroter sumatranus
Creobroter urbanus
Creobroter vitripennis

Genus †Cretophotina
†Cretophotina mongolica
†Cretophotina santanensis
†Cretophotina serotina
†Cretophotina tristriata

Genus Dactylopteryx
Dactylopteryx flexuosa
Dactylopteryx intermedia
Dactylopteryx orientalis

Genus Danuria
Also known as giant grass mantises, these are characterised by long slender bodies and sloping, pointed eyes.
Danuria affinis
Danuria angusticollis
Danuria barbozae
Danuria buchholzi
Danuria congica
Danuria contorta
Danuria fusca
Danuria gracilis
Danuria impannosa
Danuria kilimandjarica
Danuria obscuripennis
Danuria serratodentata
Danuria sublineata
Danuria thunbergi

Genus Danuriella
Danuriella altera
Danuriella andriai
Danuriella anjouanensis
Danuriella griveaudi
Danuriella irregularis
Danuriella madagascariensis 
Danuriella marojejyensis
Danuriella mayottensis
Danuriella merigueti
Danuriella sogai
Danuriella tigrina
Danuriella viettei

Genus Decimiana
Decimiana bolivari
Decimiana clavata
Decimiana elliptica
Decimiana gaucha
Decimiana hebardi
Decimiana rehni
Decimiana tessellata

Genus Deiphobe
Deiphobe australiana
Deiphobe brevipennis
Deiphobe brunneri
Deiphobe infuscata
Deiphobe longipes
Deiphobe mesomelas
Deiphobe moseri
Deiphobe xanthoptera

Genus Deiphobella
Deiphobella gardneri
Deiphobella laticeps

Genus Deromantis
Deromantis limbalicollis

Genus Deroplatys

Deroplatys, the best-known of the so-called dead leaf mantises, are native to Asia.

 Deroplatys angustata (Westwood, 1845)
 Deroplatys cordata (Fabricius, 1798)
 Deroplatys desiccata (Westwood, 1839) (giant dead leaf mantis, Malaysian dead leaf mantis, dead leaf mantis)
 Deroplatys gorochovi (Anisyutkin, 1998)
 Deroplatys indica (Roy, 2007)
 Deroplatys lobata (Guérin-Méneville (1838) (Malaysian dead leaf mantis, dead leaf mantis)
 Deroplatys moultoni (Giglio-Tos, 1917)
 Deroplatys philippinica (Werner, 1922) (Philippines dead leaf mantis)
 Deroplatys rhombica (Brunner, 1897)
 Deroplatys sarawaca (Westwood, 1889)
 Deroplatys trigonodera (Westwood, 1889) (dead leaf mantis)
 Deroplatys truncata (Guerin-Meneville, 1843) (dead leaf mantis)

Genus Diabantia
Diabantia minima

Genus Didymocorypha
Didymocorypha lanceolata
Didymocorypha libaii

Genus Dilatempusa
Dilatempusa aegyptiaca

Genus Dimantis
Dimantis haani

Genus Dracomantis
Dracomantis mirofraternus

Genus Dysaules
Dysaules brevipennis
Dysaules himalayanus
Dysaules longicollis
Dysaules uvana

Genus Dysaulophthalma
Dysaulophthalma nathani

Genus Dystacta
Dystacta alticeps
Dystacta tigrifrutex

Genus Dystactula
Dystactula grisea
Dystactula kaltenbachi
Dystactula natalensis

Genus Elaea
Elaea gestroi
Elaea infumata
Elaea marchali
Elaea perloides
Elaea richteri
Elaea solimani
Elaea somalica

Genus Elmantis
Elmantis lata
Elmantis nira
Elmantis trincomaliae

Genus Empusa

Empusa binotata
Empusa fasciata
Empusa guttula
Empusa hedenborgii
Empusa longicollis
Empusa pennata (conehead mantis, also Spanish  meaning "stick mantis")
Empusa pennicornis
Empusa romboidea
Empusa simonyi
Empusa spinosa
Empusa uvarovi

Genus Enicophlebia
Enicophlebia hilara
Enicophlebia pallida

Genus Entella
Entella angolensis
Entella angolica
Entella brunni
Entella congica
Entella delalandi
Entella exilis
Entella femina
Entella fuliginosa
Entella gaerdesi
Entella grandis
Entella machadoi
Entella meruensis
Entella minor
Entella natalica
Entella nebulosa
Entella obscura
Entella orientalis
Entella personata
Entella pusilla
Entella reussi
Entella rudebecki
Entella rukwaensis
Entella stegmanni
Entella taborana
Entella transvaalica
Entella vitticeps

Genus Entelloptera
Entelloptera rogenhoferi

Genus Eomantis
Eomantis guttatipennis
Eomantis iridipennis
Eomantis yunnanensis

Genus Epaphrodita
Epaphrodita lobivertex
Epaphrodita musarum
Epaphrodita undulata

Genus Ephestiasula

Ephestiasula obscura
Ephestiasula rogenhoferi
Ephestiasula woodmasoni

Genus Ephierodula
Ephierodula albomaculata
Ephierodula excellens
Ephierodula heteroptera
Ephierodula meihuashana

Genus Episcopomantis

Episcopomantis chalybea
Episcopomantis congica

Genus Epitenodera
Epitenodera brevipennis
Epitenodera capitata
Epitenodera equatoriana
Epitenodera gambiensis
Epitenodera herbacea
Epitenodera houyi
Epitenodera nimbana

Genus Epsomantis
Epsomantis tortricoides

Genus Eremiaphila

Eremiaphila ammonita
Eremiaphila andresi
Eremiaphila anubis
Eremiaphila arabica
Eremiaphila aristidis
Eremiaphila audouini
Eremiaphila barbara
Eremiaphila berndstiewi
Eremiaphila bifasciata
Eremiaphila bovei
Eremiaphila braueri
Eremiaphila brevipennis
Eremiaphila brunneri (common desert mantis)
Eremiaphila cairina
Eremiaphila cerisyi
Eremiaphila collenettei
Eremiaphila cordofana
Eremiaphila cycloptera
Eremiaphila dagi
Eremiaphila dentata
Eremiaphila denticollis
Eremiaphila foureaui
Eremiaphila fraseri
Eremiaphila genei
Eremiaphila gigas
Eremiaphila hebraica
Eremiaphila heluanensis
Eremiaphila irridipennis
Eremiaphila khamsini
Eremiaphila kheychi
Eremiaphila klunzingeri
Eremiaphila laeviceps
Eremiaphila lefebvrii
Eremiaphila luxor
Eremiaphila maculipennis
Eremiaphila monodi
Eremiaphila moretii
Eremiaphila murati
Eremiaphila mzabi
Eremiaphila nilotica
Eremiaphila nova
Eremiaphila numida
Eremiaphila persica
Eremiaphila petiti
Eremiaphila pierrei
Eremiaphila pyramidum
Eremiaphila rectangulata
Eremiaphila reticulata
Eremiaphila rohlfsi
Eremiaphila rotundipennis
Eremiaphila rufipennis
Eremiaphila rufula
Eremiaphila savignyi
Eremiaphila somalica
Eremiaphila spinulosa
Eremiaphila tuberculifera
Eremiaphila turica
Eremiaphila typhon
Eremiaphila uvarovi
Eremiaphila voltaensis
Eremiaphila werneri
Eremiaphila wettsteini
Eremiaphila yemenita
Eremiaphila zetterstedti (desert pebble mantis)

Genus Eremoplana
Eremoplana guerini
Eremoplana infelix

Genus Euchomena
Euchomena madecassa

Genus Euchomenella
Members of this genus are known as long neck mantises or twig mantises.

Euchomenella adwinae
Euchomenella apicalis
Euchomenella heteroptera (twig mantis, Malaysia long neck mantis)
Euchomenella macrops (long neck mantis)
Euchomenella matilei
Euchomenella moluccarum
Euchomenella thoracica
Euchomenella udovichenkoi

Genus Eumiopteryx
Eumiopteryx bicentenaria
Eumiopteryx laticollis
Eumiopteryx terrai

Genus Eumusonia
Eumusonia intermedia
Eumusonia livida
Eumusonia viridis

Genus Euthyphleps
Euthyphleps curtipes
Euthyphleps rectivenis
Euthyphleps tectiformis

Genus Exparoxypilus
Exparoxypilus africanus

Genus  Fuga
Fuga annulipes
Fuga fluminensis
Fuga grimaldii

Genus Fulcinia
Fulcinia alaris
Fulcinia exilis
Fulcinia lobata
Fulcinia punctipes
Fulcinia uxor
Fulcinia variipennis

Genus Fulciniella
Fulciniella infumata
Fulciniella loriae
Fulciniella verticalis

Genus Fulciniola
Fulciniola snelleni

Genus Galapagia
Galapagia amazonica
Galapagia solitaria

Genus Galepsus
Galepsus aberrans
Galepsus affinis
Galepsus angolensis
Galepsus beieri
Galepsus binotatus
Galepsus bioculatus
Galepsus bipunctatus
Galepsus birkenmeierae
Galepsus bispinosus
Galepsus brincki
Galepsus brunneri
Galepsus bucheti
Galepsus buettneri
Galepsus cacuminatus
Galepsus capensis
Galepsus capitatus
Galepsus centralis
Galepsus cliquennoisi
Galepsus congicus
Galepsus coronatus
Galepsus culminans
Galepsus damaranus
Galepsus decipiens
Galepsus denigratus
Galepsus diversus
Galepsus dubius
Galepsus dudleyi
Galepsus erythraeus
Galepsus fallaciosus
Galepsus fallax
Galepsus feae
Galepsus femoratus
Galepsus focki
Galepsus fumipennis
Galepsus globiceps
Galepsus gracilis
Galepsus inermis
Galepsus intermedius
Galepsus konakrynus
Galepsus laticeps
Galepsus lenticularis
Galepsus letabaensis
Galepsus machadoi
Galepsus malawiensis
Galepsus meridionalis
Galepsus minima
Galepsus minutus
Galepsus montanus
Galepsus nigricoxa
Galepsus nimulensis
Galepsus nyassensis
Galepsus oxycephalus
Galepsus pentheri
Galepsus rhodesicus
Galepsus rouxi
Galepsus schwetzi
Galepsus scorteccii
Galepsus signatus
Galepsus sudanensis
Galepsus supervacaneus
Galepsus tenuis
Galepsus thomseni
Galepsus transvaalensis
Galepsus ulricae
Galepsus wittei

Genus Galinthias

Galinthias amoena
Galinthias meruensis
Galinthias occidentalis
Galinthias philbyi 
Galinthias rhomboidalis

Genus Geomantis
Geomantis algerica
Geomantis larvoides

Genus Geothespis
Geothespis australis

Genus Gigliotoscelis
Gigliotoscelis simulans

Genus Gildella
Gildella suavis

Genus Gimantis
 Gimantis assamica 
 Gimantis authaemon 
 Gimantis insularis 
 Gimantis marmorata

Genus Gonatista
Gonatista grisea (grizzled mantis, lichen mimic)
Gonatista jaiba
Gonatista major 
Gonatista phryganoides 
Gonatista reticulata

Genus Gonatistella
Gonatistella nigropicta

Genus Gongylus

Gongylus gongylodes (wandering violin mantis, Indian rose mantis)
Gongylus pauperatus
Gongylus trachelophyllus

Genus Gonypeta
Gonypeta borneana
Gonypeta brigittae
Gonypeta brunneri
Gonypeta humbertiana
Gonypeta noctivaga
Gonypeta punctata
Gonypeta rotundata
Gonypeta simplex

Genus Gonypetella
Gonypetella atra
Gonypetella atrocephala
Gonypetella australis
Gonypetella carinata
Gonypetella deletrix
Gonypetella flavicornis
Gonypetella fusca
Gonypetella fuscipes
Gonypetella infumata
Gonypetella ivoirensis
Gonypetella kilimandjarica
Gonypetella punctata

Genus Gonypetoides
Gonypetoides brevipennis

Genus Gonypetyllis
Gonypetyllis liliputana
Gonypetyllis micra
Gonypetyllis semuncialis

Genus Gretella
Gretella gracilis

Genus Gyromantis
The two members of this genus are commonly known as bark mantises.
Gyromantis kraussii (spiny bark mantis)
Gyromantis occidentalis (eastern bark mantis)

Genus Haania
Haania aspera
Haania borneana
Haania confusa
Haania dispar
Haania doroshenkoi
Haania lobiceps
Haania orlovi
Haania philippina
Haania simplex
Haania vitalisi

Genus Hagiomantis 
Hagiomantis mesopoda
Hagiomantis ornata
Hagiomantis pallida
Hagiomantis superba
Hagiomantis surinamensis

Genus Hapalogymnes 
Hapalogymnes gymnes

Genus Hapalomantis 
Hapalomantis abyssinica
Hapalomantis congica
Hapalomantis katangica
Hapalomantis lacualis
Hapalomantis minima
Hapalomantis orba
Hapalomantis rhombochir

Genus Hapalopeza 
Hapalopeza fulmeki
Hapalopeza nigricornis
Hapalopeza nilgirica
Hapalopeza nitens
Hapalopeza periyara
Hapalopeza tigrina

Genus Hapalopezella 
Hapalopezella maculata

Genus Harpagomantis 
Harpagomantis tricolor

Genus Hebardia 
Hebardia pellucida

Genus Hebardiella 
Hebardiella karnyi
Hebardiella rehni

Genus Hedigerella 
Hedigerella fasciatella

Genus Heliomantis 
Heliomantis elegans

Genus Helvia 
Helvia cardinalis

Genus Hemiempusa 
Hemiempusa capensis

Genus Hestiasula 
Hestiasula brachyptera
Hestiasula brunneriana
Hestiasula castetsi
Hestiasula ceylonica
Hestiasula gyldenstolpei
Hestiasula kastneri
Hestiasula masoni
Hestiasula nigrofemorata
Hestiasula woodi
Hestiasula zhejiangensis

Genus Heterochaeta 
Heterochaeta bernardii
Heterochaeta girardi
Heterochaeta kumari
Heterochaeta lamellosa
Heterochaeta occidentalis
Heterochaeta orientalis
Heterochaeta pantherina
Heterochaeta reticulata
Heterochaeta strachani
Heterochaeta tenuipes
Heterochaeta zavattarii

Genus Heterochaetula 
Heterochaetula fissispinis
Heterochaetula straminea
Heterochaetula tricolor

Genus Heteronutarsus 
Heteronutarsus aegyptiacus
Heteronutarsus albipennis
Heteronutarsus arenivagus
Heteronutarsus zolotarevskyi

Genus Heterovates 
Heterovates pardalina

Genus Hicetia 
Hicetia breviceps
Hicetia goediana
Hicetia goeldiana

Genus Hierodula

The giant Asian mantis genus Hierodula contains numerous large species and has a range that stretches from India to Hawaii.
Hierodula ansusana
Hierodula aruana
Hierodula assamensis
Hierodula atrocoxata
Hierodula beieri
Hierodula bhamoana
Hierodula biaka
Hierodula borneana
Hierodula brunnea
Hierodula chamoana
Hierodula chinensis
Hierodula coarctata
Hierodula confusa
Hierodula crassa
Hierodula cuchingina'''Hierodula dolichopteraHierodula doveriHierodula dyakaHierodula everetti'Hierodula fumipennisHierodula fuscescensHierodula gigliotosiHierodula gracilicollisHierodula harpyiaHierodula heinrichiHierodula inconspicuaHierodula ingensHierodula italiiHierodula jobinaHierodula kapauranaHierodula laevicollisHierodula lamasongaHierodula latipennisHierodula longedentataHierodula macrodentataHierodula macrostigmataHierodula maculataHierodula maculisternumHierodula majorHierodula majusculaHierodula malaccanaHierodula malayaHierodula membranacea (giant Asian mantis, Sri Lanka mantis, green mantis)Hierodula microdonHierodula mindanensisHierodula modestaHierodula monochroaHierodula multispinulosaHierodula nicobaricaHierodula obiensisHierodula obtusataHierodula oraeaHierodula ovataHierodula papuaHierodula parvicepsHierodula patellifera (giant Asian mantis)Hierodula perakanaHierodula philippinaHierodula pistillinotaHierodula prosternalisHierodula pulchraHierodula pulchripesHierodula purpurescensHierodula pustuliferaHierodula pygmaeaHierodula quadridensHierodula quadripunctataHierodula quinquecallosaHierodula quinquepatellataHierodula rajahHierodula raluminaHierodula robustaHierodula rufomaculataHierodula rufopatellataHierodula salomonis (jade mantis)Hierodula samangensisHierodula sarsinorumHierodula saussureiHierodula schultzeiHierodula scutataHierodula simbanganaHierodula similisHierodula siporanaHierodula soronganaHierodula sternostictaHierodula stigmataHierodula striataHierodula striatipesHierodula szentivanyiHierodula tenuidentataHierodula tenuisHierodula timorensisHierodula togianaHierodula tonkinensisHierodula tornicaHierodula transcaucasicaHierodula trimaculaHierodula unimaculataHierodula venosaHierodula ventralisHierodula versicolorHierodula vitreoidesHierodula werneriHierodula westwoodiGenus HierodulellaHierodulella celebensisHierodulella reticulataHierodulella sororGenus HolaptilonHolaptilon brevipugilisHolaptilon pusillulum (jumping mantis)

Genus HondurantemnaHondurantemna chespiritoiGenus HoplocoryphellaHoplocoryphella grandisGenus Hoplocorypha

Members of this genus are known collectively as African stick mantises.Hoplocorypha acutaHoplocorypha bicornisHoplocorypha boromensisHoplocorypha bottegiHoplocorypha boviformisHoplocorypha brevicollisHoplocorypha cacomanaHoplocorypha carliHoplocorypha congicaHoplocorypha dentataHoplocorypha distinguendaHoplocorypha foliataHoplocorypha fumosaHoplocorypha galeataHoplocorypha garuanaHoplocorypha hamuliferaHoplocorypha lacualisHoplocorypha lobataHoplocorypha macraHoplocorypha melleaHoplocorypha montanaHoplocorypha nanaHoplocorypha narocanaHoplocorypha nigericaHoplocorypha nigraHoplocorypha perplexaHoplocorypha piceaHoplocorypha punctataHoplocorypha rapaxHoplocorypha salfiiHoplocorypha saussuriiHoplocorypha sordidaHoplocorypha striataHoplocorypha turneriHoplocorypha ugandanaHoplocorypha vittataHoplocorypha witteiGenus HoplocoryphellaHoplocoryphella grandisGenus HumbertiellaHumbertiella affinisHumbertiella africanaHumbertiella assimilataHumbertiella brunneriHumbertiella ceylonicaHumbertiella indicaHumbertiella laosanaHumbertiella nadaHumbertiella nigrospinosaHumbertiella ocularisHumbertiella similisHumbertiella sindhicaHumbertiella taprobanarumHumbertiella yunnanensisGenus HyalomantisHyalomantis antsingicaHyalomantis madagascariensisHyalomantis murziniHyalomantis whitingiGenus Hymenopus
Hymenopus species are commonly called orchid mantises.Hymenopus bicornis Hymenopus coronatoidesHymenopus coronatus (Malaysian orchid mantis, orchid mantis)

Genus HypsicoryphaHypsicorypha gracilisGenus IdolomantisIdolomantis diabolica (giant devil's flower mantis, devil's flower mantis)

Genus IdolomorphaIdolomorpha dentifrons (alien head mantis)Idolomorpha lateralisIdolomorpha madagascariensisIdolomorpha sagittaGenus IlomantisIlomantis ginsburgaeIlomantis thalassinaGenus ImaIma fuscaGenus IndothespisIndothespis assamensisGenus IndomenellaIndomenella indicaGenus IridopteryxIridopteryx iridipennisGenus IrisIris caecaIris desertiIris insolitaIris nanaIris narzykuloviIris oratoria (Mediterranean mantis)Iris orientalisIris persaIris persiminimaIris pitcheriIris polysticticaIris senegalensisIris splendidaIris strigosaGenus IschnomantisIschnomantis aethiopicaIschnomantis fasciataIschnomantis fatiloquaIschnomantis flavescensIschnomantis gigasIschnomantis gracilisIschnomantis grandisIschnomantis mediaIschnomantis perfidaIschnomantis spinigeraIschnomantis usambaricaIschnomantis werneriGenus †Jersimantis
†Jersimantis burmiticus†Jersimantis luzziiGenus JunodiaJunodia amoenaJunodia beieriJunodia congicaJunodia hararensisJunodia lameyiJunodia maternaschulzeiJunodia spinosaJunodia stieweiJunodia strigipennisJunodia vansomereniJunodia vansoniGenus †Kazakhophotina
†Kazakhophotina corruptaGenus KongobathaKongobatha diademataKongobatha papuaGenus LagrecacanthopsLagrecacanthops brasiliensisLagrecacanthops guyanensisGenus LeptocolaLeptocola fragilisLeptocola giraffaLeptocola gracilisLeptocola gracillimaLeptocola phthisicaLeptocola seriepunctataLeptocola stanleyanaGenus LeptomantellaLeptomantella albellaLeptomantella ceylonicaLeptomantella fragilisLeptomantella indicaLeptomantella lacteaLeptomantella montanaLeptomantella nigrocoxataLeptomantella parvaLeptomantella tonkinaeLeptomantella xizangensisGenus LeptomiopteryxLeptomiopteryx argentinaLeptomiopteryx disparGenus LeptosibyllaLeptosibylla gracilisGenus LigariaLigaria aberransLigaria affinisLigaria backlundiLigaria brevicollisLigaria brevisLigaria chopardiLigaria claraLigaria costalisLigaria culicivoraLigaria dentataLigaria denticollisLigaria diabolicaLigaria inexpectataLigaria jeanneliLigaria quadrinotataLigaria quadripunctataLigaria senegalensisGenus LigariellaLigariella australisLigariella bicornutaLigariella bolivariLigariella gracilisLigariella trigonaliGenus LigentellaLigentella beieriLigentella lacualisLigentella zairensisGenus LiguaneaLiguanea pediodromiaGenus LitaneutriaLitaneutria elongataLitaneutria emarginataLitaneutria minor (minor ground mantis)Litaneutria ocularisLitaneutria pacificaLitaneutria skinneri (Skinner's ground mantis)

Genus †Lithophotina
†Lithophotina floccosaGenus LiturgusaLiturgusa actuosaLiturgusa algoreiLiturgusa bororumLiturgusa cameroniLiturgusa cayennensisLiturgusa charpentieriLiturgusa curaLiturgusa cursorLiturgusa dominicaLiturgusa fossettiLiturgusa guyanensisLiturgusa kirtlandiLiturgusa krattorumLiturgusa lichenalisLiturgusa manausensisLiturgusa maroniLiturgusa mayaLiturgusa milleriLiturgusa neblinaLiturgusa nubeculosaLiturgusa purusLiturgusa stiewei Liturgusa tessaeLiturgusa trinidadensisLiturgusa zoaeGenus LiturgusellaLiturgusella malagassaGenus LobocnemeLobocneme colombiaeLobocneme ictericaLobocneme lobipesGenus LobothespisLobothespis vignaiGenus MachairimaMachairima papuaGenus MacracanthopusMacracanthopus schoutedeniMacracanthopus seydeliGenus MacrodanuriaMacrodanuria baculiformisMacrodanuria elongataMacrodanuria phasmoidesGenus MacromusoniaMacromusonia conspersaMacromusonia majorGenus MacropopaMacropopa lobataGenus MaculatoscelisMaculatoscelis ascalaphoidesMaculatoscelis gilloniMaculatoscelis maculataGenus MacromantisMacromantis hyalinaMacromantis nicaraguaeMacromantis ovalifoliaMacromantis saussureiGenus MajangaMajanga basilarisMajanga spinosaMajanga tricolorGenus MajangellaMajangella carliMajangella moultoniMajangella ophirensisGenus MantasoaMantasoa lebbeiMantasoa maculataGenus MantelliasMantellias pubicornisGenus MantiliaMantilia ehrmanniGenus MantillicaMantillica nigricansGenus MantisMantis beieri Mantis callifera Mantis carinata Mantis dilaticollis Mantis emortualis Mantis griveaudi Mantis insignis Mantis macroalata Mantis macrocephala Mantis octospilota (eight-spotted mantis, blackbarrel mantis)Mantis pia Mantis religiosa (European mantis)Mantis splendida Mantis tricolorGenus Mantoida

This genus is concentrated in Mexico, Central America, and South America.Mantoida argentinaeMantoida beieriMantoida brunnerianaMantoida burmeisteriMantoida fulgidipennis†Mantoida matthiasglinkiMantoida maya (little Yucatán mantis)Mantoida nitidaMantoida ronderosiMantoida schraderiMantoida tenuisGenus †Megaphotina
†Megaphotina sichotensisGenus MekongomantisMekongomantis quinquespinosaGenus MellieraMelliera brevipesMelliera chorotegaMelliera majorMelliera mordaxGenus MellierellaMellierella biroiMellierella trifasciataGenus MelomantisMelomantis africanaMelomantis asemaGenus MemantisMemantis anomalaMemantis fuliginosaMemantis gardneriMemantis minorGenus MesopteryxMesopteryx alata (Saussure, 1870)Mesopteryx platycephala (Stal, 1877)Mesopteryx robusta (Wood-Mason, 1882)

Genus MetacromantisMetacromantis nigrofemorataMetacromantis oxyopsGenus MetagalepsusMetagalepsus occidentalisMetagalepsus stramineusGenus MetallyticusMetallyticus fallaxMetallyticus pallipesMetallyticus semiaeneusMetallyticus splendidusMetallyticus violaceusGenus MetatoxoderaMetatoxodera subparallelaGenus MetiliaMetilia amazonica (Beier, 1930)Metilia boliviana (Werner, 1927)Metilia brunnerii (Saussure, 1871) 

Genus MetoxypilusMetoxypilus costalisMetoxypilus lobifronsMetoxypilus werneriGenus MetriomantisMetriomantis amazonicaMetriomantis bolivianaMetriomantis cupidoMetriomantis occidentalisMetriomantis paraensisMetriomantis PhotinainaMetriomantis pilosellaMetriomantis vitreaGenus MicromantisMicromantis glaucaGenus MicrophotinaMicrophotina panguanensisMicrophotina vitripennisGenus MicrothespisMicrothespis dmitriewiMicrothespis evansiMicrothespis sindhensisGenus MiobantiaMiobantia apteraMiobantia ciliataMiobantia fuscataMiobantia nebulosaMiobantia phryganeaMiobantia rusticaGenus MiomantisMiomantis abyssinica (Egyptian mantis, Ethiopian mantis)Miomantis acutipesMiomantis aequalisMiomantis affinisMiomantis alataMiomantis amanicaMiomantis andreiniiMiomantis annulipesMiomantis arabicaMiomantis asignataMiomantis aurantiacaMiomantis aureaMiomantis australisMiomantis binotataMiomantis bintumanensisMiomantis brachypteraMiomantis brevipennisMiomantis brunniMiomantis buettneriMiomantis caffra (South African mantis, springbok mantis)Miomantis cinnabarinaMiomantis ciprianiiMiomantis coxalisMiomantis devylderiMiomantis diademataMiomantis exilisMiomantis fallaxMiomantis femininaMiomantis fenestrataMiomantis gracilisMiomantis griffiniiMiomantis gyldenstolpeiMiomantis helenaeMiomantis kibwezianaMiomantis kilimandjaricaMiomantis lacualisMiomantis lamtoensisMiomantis longicollisMiomantis menelikiiMiomantis milmilenaMiomantis minutaMiomantis misanaMiomantis moeranaMiomantis mombasicaMiomantis monachaMiomantis montanaMiomantis multipunctataMiomantis nairobiensisMiomantis natalicaMiomantis nyassensisMiomantis ornataMiomantis paykullii (Egyptian mantis)Miomantis pellucidaMiomantis planivertexMiomantis prasinaMiomantis preussiMiomantis pygmaeaMiomantis quadripunctataMiomantis rebeliMiomantis rehniMiomantis rouxiMiomantis rubraMiomantis sangaranaMiomantis saussureiMiomantis scabricollisMiomantis semialataMiomantis sjostedtiMiomantis steelaeMiomantis tanganaMiomantis tenuisMiomantis usambaricaMiomantis vitreaMiomantis witteiGenus MiracanthopsMiracanthops eseejjaMiracanthops lombardoiMiracanthops poulainiGenus MiromantisMiromantis mirandulaMiromantis thalassinaMiromantis yunnanensisGenus MuscimantisMuscimantis montanaGenus MusoniaMusonia bolivianaMusonia costalisMusonia fuscescensMusonia lineataMusonia maculataMusonia seclusaMusonia sexdentataMusonia surinamaGenus MusoniellaMusoniella affinisMusoniella argentinaMusoniella brasiliensisMusoniella chopardiMusoniella fragilisMusoniella iparangaMusoniella laevithoraxMusoniella longicaudaMusoniella parvaMusoniella precariaGenus MusoniolaMusoniola conservatrixMusoniola dohrnianaMusoniola venezuelanaMusoniola vicinaGenus MyrcinusMyrcinus asperaMyrcinus octispinusMyrcinus tuberosusGenus Myrmecomantis
The single species in this genus is an ant mantis.Myrmecomantis atra (ant mantis)

Genus MythomantisMythomantis confusaMythomantis gracilisMythomantis serrataGenus NamamantisNamamantis nigropunctataGenus NannofulciniaNannofulcinia pulchraGenus NanomantisNanomantis australisNanomantis gilolaeNanomantis lacteaNanomantis yunnanensisGenus NausicaamantisNausicaamantis miyazakiiGenus NegromantisNegromantis gracilisNegromantis gracillimaNegromantis lutescensNegromantis millotiNegromantis modestaGenus NemothaNemotha metallicaGenus NeocilniaNeocilnia gracilisGenus NeodanuriaNeodanuria bolauanaNeodanuria simonettaiGenus NeomantisNeomantis australisNeomantis hyalinaNeomantis robustaGenus NesogalepsusNesogalepsus andasibensisNesogalepsus anovensisNesogalepsus enigmaticusNesogalepsus hovaNesogalepsus mandenensisNesogalepsus mouliniNesogalepsus schuetteiGenus NesoxypilusNesoxypilus albomaculatusNesoxypilus pseudomyrmexGenus NilomantisNilomantis edmundsiNilomantis floweriGenus NothogalepsusNothogalepsus planivertexGenus NotomantisNotomantis brunnerianaNotomantis chlorophanaGenus NullaboraNullabora flavoguttataGenus Odontomantis
Some members of this genus practice ant mimicry when young and are known as ant mantises. The name grass mantis has also been applied to some species.Odontomantis brachypteraOdontomantis buehleriOdontomantis chayuensisOdontomantis euphrosyneOdontomantis foveafronsOdontomantis hainanaOdontomantis laticollisOdontomantis longipennisOdontomantis micansOdontomantis montanaOdontomantis monticolaOdontomantis nigrimarginalisOdontomantis ornataOdontomantis parvaOdontomantis planiceps (Asian ant mantis, grass mantis)Odontomantis pulchraOdontomantis rhyssaOdontomantis sinensisOdontomantis xizangensisGenus OestomantisOestomantis anoplonotusOestomantis bacillarisGenus OligocanthopusOligocanthopus ornataGenus OligomantisOligomantis hyalinaOligomantis mentaweianaOligomantis orientalisGenus OligonicellaOligonicella bollianaOligonicella brunneriOligonicella punctulataOligonicella scudderiOligonicella striolataOligonicella tessellataGenus OligonyxOligonyx bicornisOligonyx bidensOligonyx dohrnianusOligonyx insularisOligonyx mayaGenus OmomantisOmomantis sigmaOmomantis tigrinaOmomantis zebrataGenus OrthoderaOrthodera australiana Orthodera burmeisteri Orthodera gracilis Orthodera gunni Orthodera insularisOrthodera ministralis (garden mantis)Orthodera novaezealandiae (New Zealand mantis)Orthodera rubrocoxataOrthodera timorensisGenus OrthoderellaOrthoderella deluchiiOrthoderella elongataOrthoderella majorOrthoderella ornataGenus OrthoderinaOrthoderina fergusonianaOrthoderina stramineaGenus OrmomantisOrmomantis indicaGenus Otomantis
Some species within this genus are known as boxer mantises.Otomantis auritaOtomantis bolivariOtomantis capiricaOtomantis casaicaOtomantis centralisOtomantis minimaOtomantis rendalliOtomantis scutigeraOtomantis trimaculaGenus OvalimantisOvalimantis maculataGenus OxyelaeaOxyelaea elegansOxyelaea heteromorphaOxyelaea stefaniaeGenus OxymantisOxymantis punctillataGenus OxyophthalmaOxyophthalma engaeaOxyophthalma gracilisGenus OxyophthalmellusOxyophthalmellus rehniOxyophthalmellus somalicusGenus OxyopsisOxyopsis acutipennisOxyopsis festaeOxyopsis gracilis (South American green mantis)Oxyopsis lobeterOxyopsis mediaOxyopsis obtusaOxyopsis oculeaOxyopsis peruviana (Peruvian mantis)Oxyopsis rubicundaOxyopsis saussureiOxyopsis staliGenus Oxyothespis
Members of this genus have been called grass mantises.Oxyothespis acuticepsOxyothespis alataOxyothespis apostataOxyothespis bifurcataOxyothespis brevicollisOxyothespis brevipennisOxyothespis dumonti (North African grass mantis)Oxyothespis flavipennisOxyothespis longicollisOxyothespis longipennisOxyothespis mammillataOxyothespis maroccanaOxyothespis meridionalisOxyothespis niloticaOxyothespis noctivagaOxyothespis parvaOxyothespis pellucidaOxyothespis persicaOxyothespis philbyiOxyothespis senegalensisOxyothespis sudanensisOxyothespis tricolorOxyothespis villiersiOxyothespis wagneriGenus OxypiloideaOxypiloidea acuminataOxypiloidea angolicaOxypiloidea brunnerianaOxypiloidea camerunensisOxypiloidea carvalhoiOxypiloidea centrafricanaOxypiloidea congicaOxypiloidea dargeiOxypiloidea denticulataOxypiloidea granulataOxypiloidea ivoirensisOxypiloidea jeanneliOxypiloidea lobataOxypiloidea maldesiOxypiloidea margarethaeOxypiloidea maroccanaOxypiloidea mortuifoliaOxypiloidea murphyiOxypiloidea namibianaOxypiloidea nigericaOxypiloidea occidentalisOxypiloidea orientalisOxypiloidea sinuataOxypiloidea tridensOxypiloidea zernyiOxypiloidea nigericaGenus OxypilusOxypilus annulatusOxypilus burriOxypilus capensisOxypilus cherlonneixiOxypilus descampsi Oxypilus enei Oxypilus falcatus Oxypilus flavicoxa Oxypilus gillonae Oxypilus hamatus  Oxypilus inscriptus  Oxypilus lamottei  Oxypilus maculifemur  Oxypilus meruensis  Oxypilus montanus  Oxypilus pallidus  Oxypilus pierrei  Oxypilus polyacanthus  Oxypilus raggei  Oxypilus servillei  Oxypilus tanzanicus  Oxypilus transvalensis Oxypilus villiersiGenus PachymantisPachymantis bicingulataPachymantis dohertyiPachymantis maculicoxaPachymantis piceifemurGenus PanurgicaPanurgica basilewskyiPanurgica compressicollisPanurgica duplexPanurgica feaePanurgica fraterculaPanurgica fuscaPanurgica langiPanurgica liberianaPanurgica mendePanurgica rehniGenus PapubolbePapubolbe curvidensPapubolbe eximiaPapubolbe flavaPapubolbe gressittiPapubolbe longipennisPapubolbe piceaGenus PapugalepsusPapugalepsus alatusPapugalepsus elongatusGenus ParablepharisParablepharis kuhliiGenus ParacilniaParacilnia neaveiGenus Paradiabantia
 Paradiabantia perparvaGenus Paragalepsus
 Paragalepsus bassari Paragalepsus gestri Paragalepsus nigericus Paragalepsus oxyops Paragalepsus toganus Paragalepsus vrydaghiGenus ParahestiasulaParahestiasula obscuraGenus Paraligaria
 Paraligaria malawicaGenus Paralygdamia
 Paralygdamia fisheri Paralygdamia gigliotosi Paralygdamia grandidieri Paralygdamia ifatyensis Paralygdamia madagascariensis Paralygdamia madecassa Paralygdamia nosyensis Paralygdamia punctata Paralygdamia sikorai Paralygdamia wintrebertiGenus Paramantis
 Paramantis natalensis Paramantis nyassana Paramantis prasina Paramantis sacra Paramantis togana Paramantis victoriana Paramantis viridisGenus Paramantoida
 Paramantoida amazonicaGenus Paramorphoscelis
 Paramorphoscelis gondokorensisGenus ParamusoniaParamusonia cubensisGenus ParananomantisParananomantis brevisGenus ParaoxypilusParaoxypilus armatusParaoxypilus distinctusParaoxypilus flavifemurParaoxypilus insularisParaoxypilus kimberleyensisParaoxypilus laticollisParaoxypilus tasmaniensisParaoxypilus verreauxiiGenus ParaphotinaParaphotina caatingaensisParaphotina insolitaParaphotina occidentalisParaphotina reticulataGenus ParapsychomantisParapsychomantis vietnamensisGenus PararivetinaPararivetina fraseriGenus ParaseveriniaParaseverinia finotiGenus ParasphendaleParasphendale affinis (budwing mantis)Parasphendale africanaParasphendale agrionina (budwing mantis)Parasphendale albicostaParasphendale costalisParasphendale ghindanaParasphendale gracilicollisParasphendale minorParasphendale scioanaParasphendale staliParasphendale vinctaGenus ParastagmatopteraParastagmatoptera bororoi Parastagmatoptera flavoguttata Parastagmatoptera immaculata Parastagmatoptera pellucidaParastagmatoptera simulacrumParastagmatoptera sottileiParastagmatoptera theresopolitanaParastagmatoptera unipunctataParastagmatoptera vitreolaParastagmatoptera zernyiGenus ParatheopompaParatheopompa siamensisGenus ParathespisParathespis humbertianaGenus ParatithroneParatithrone royiGenus Paratoxodera
Paratoxodera is a genus of stick mantises.Paratoxodera borneana (Borneo stick mantis)Paratoxodera cornicollis (giant Malaysian stick mantis)Paratoxodera gigliotosiParatoxodera marshallaeParatoxodera meggittiParatoxodera polyacanthaGenus ParentellaParentella benguelaeParentella laticollisParentella majorParentella parvaParentella productaGenus PareuthyphlebsPareuthyphlebs arabicaPareuthyphlebs occidentalisPareuthyphlebs palmoniiPareuthyphlebs popoviPareuthyphlebs scortecciiPareuthyphlebs somalicaPareuthyphlebs uvaroviGenus ParoxyophthalmusParoxyophthalmus collarisParoxyophthalmus nigericusParoxyophthalmus ornatusParoxyophthalmus savatieriGenus PerlamantisPerlamantis algericaPerlamantis allibertiiGenus PezomantisPezomantis henryiGenus PhasmomantellaPhasmomantella nuichuanaPhasmomantella pallidaGenus PhasmomantisPhasmomantis basalis (Giglio-Tos, 1917)Phasmomantis sumichrasti (Saussure, 1861)

Genus PhotinaPhotina amplipennisPhotina gracilisPhotina ludensPhotina reticulataPhotina vitreaGenus PhotinellaPhotinella biramosaPhotinella brevisPhotinella magnaPhotinella mediaGenus PhotiomantisPhotiomantis glaucaPhotiomantis nigrolineataPhotiomantis planicephalaGenus PhthersigenaPhthersigena centralisPhthersigena conspersaPhthersigena insularisPhthersigena melaniaPhthersigena minorPhthersigena pallidifemurPhthersigena nebulosaPhthersigena timorensisPhthersigena unicornisGenus PhyllocraniaPhyllocrania illudens (Saussure & Zehntner, 1895) Phyllocrania insignis (Westwood, 1843)Phyllocrania paradoxa (Burmeister, 1838) (ghost mantis)

Genus Phyllothelys
 Phyllothelys bakeri 
 Phyllothelys breve 
 Phyllothelys cornutus Phyllothelys decipiens 
 Phyllothelys hepaticus Phyllothelys jianfenglingensis Phyllothelys mitratum Phyllothelys paradoxum 
 Phyllothelys robusta 
 Phyllothelys sinensis 
 Phyllothelys taprobanae 
 Phyllothelys werneri 
 Phyllothelys westwoodiGenus PilomantisPilomantis fuscaGenus PiscomantisPiscomantis peruanaGenus PizaiaPizaia seabraiGenus PlastogalepsusPlastogalepsus kuhlgatziGenus PlesiacanthopsPhyllovates tuberculataGenus PlatycalymmaPlatycalymma annulicornisPlatycalymma befasicaPlatycalymma dichroicaPlatycalymma latipennisPlatycalymma mahafalicaPlatycalymma vietteiGenus PliacanthopusPliacanthopus bimaculatusPliacanthopus flavusPliacanthopus malayanusPliacanthopus mantispoidesPliacanthopus visayanusGenus PlistospilotaPlistospilota camerunensisPlistospilota congicaPlistospilota gasconiPlistospilota guineensisPlistospilota insignisPlistospilota mabiricaPlistospilota maximaPlistospilota nigericaPlistospilota validissimaGenus Pnigomantis
This genus has a species of shield mantis.Pnigomantis medioconstricta (Indonesia double shield mantis, double shield mantis)

Genus PogonogasterPogonogaster latens Pogonogaster tristaniGenus PolyspilotaPolyspilota aeruginosa (Madagascan marbled mantis)Polyspilota caffra Polyspilota comorana Polyspilota griffinii (Griffin mantis)Polyspilota magna Polyspilota montana Polyspilota pavani Polyspilota robustaPolyspilota saussurei Polyspilota seychelliana Polyspilota voelzkowianaGenus PopaPopa gracilisPopa spurca (African twig mantis) - a species of twig mantis popular in captivity.

Genus PresibyllaPresibylla elegans Presibylla speciosaGenus †Prochaeradodis
†Prochaeradodis enigmaticusGenus ProhierodulaProhierodula brunneaProhierodula congicaProhierodula duchailluiProhierodula enghoffiProhierodula flavipennisProhierodula grasseiProhierodula laticollisProhierodula lineataProhierodula mundamensisProhierodula nigrispinisProhierodula ornatipennisProhierodula pictaProhierodula viridimarginataGenus PromiopteryxPromiopteryx fallaxPromiopteryx granadensisPromiopteryx punctataPromiopteryx simplexPromiopteryx stigmaticaGenus ProtoxoderaProtoxodera monstrosaGenus PseudacanthopsPseudacanthops caelebsPseudacanthops centralisPseudacanthops clorindaePseudacanthops huaoranianusPseudacanthops lobipesPseudacanthops spinulosaGenus PseudempusaPseudempusa pavoninaPseudempusa pinnapavonis (peacock mantis)

Genus Pseudocreobotra
This genus contains several species of flower mantises.Pseudocreobotra amaraePseudocreobotra ocellata (ocellated spiny flower mantis, spiny flower mantis)Pseudocreobotra wahlbergii (Walhbergi's spiny flower mantis, spiny flower mantis)

Genus PseudodystactaPseudodystacta braueriGenus PseudogalepsusPseudogalepsus disparPseudogalepsus inermisPseudogalepsus modestiorPseudogalepsus modestusPseudogalepsus nigricoxaGenus PseudoharpaxPseudoharpax abyssinicus (Beier, 1930)Pseudoharpax beieri (La Greca, 1950) Pseudoharpax crenaticollis (La Greca, 1954)Pseudoharpax dubius (La Greca, 1954)Pseudoharpax erythraeus (Giglio-Tos, 1915)Pseudoharpax francoisi (Bolivar, 1908)Pseudoharpax nigericus (Giglio-Tos, 1915)Pseudoharpax parallelus (La Greca, 1954)Pseudoharpax ugandanus (Giglio-Tos, 1915)Pseudoharpax virescens (Serville, 1839) (Gambian spotted-eye flower mantis )

Genus PseudohestiasulaPseudohestiasula borneana (Beier, 1930)

Genus PseudomantisPseudomantis albofimbriata (Stal, 1860) (false garden mantis)Pseudomantis albomarginata (Sjostedt, 1918)Pseudomantis apicalis (Saussure, 1870) Pseudomantis dimorpha (Werner, 1912)Pseudomantis hartmeyeri (Werner, 1912)Pseudomantis maculata (Saussure, 1872) Pseudomantis victorina (Westwood, 1889)

Genus PseudomiopteryxPseudomiopteryx amazonensisPseudomiopteryx bogotensisPseudomiopteryx columbicaPseudomiopteryx decipiensPseudomiopteryx festaePseudomiopteryx guyanensisPseudomiopteryx infuscataPseudomiopteryx maculataPseudomiopteryx meridanaPseudomiopteryx spinifronsGenus PseudomusoniaPseudomusonia carlottaePseudomusonia feraPseudomusonia lineativentrisPseudomusonia maculosaPseudomusonia rapaxGenus PseudopogonogasterPseudopogonogaster hebardiPseudopogonogaster kanjarisPseudopogonogaster mirabilisPseudopogonogaster muscosaGenus PseudostagmatopteraPseudostagmatoptera infuscataGenus Pseudovates
Some species within this genus are known as unicorn mantises or stick mantises.Pseudovates arizonae (Arizona unicorn mantis)Pseudovates bidens Pseudovates brasiliensis Pseudovates brevicollis Pseudovates brevicornis Pseudovates chlorophaeaPseudovates cingulata Pseudovates cornutaPseudovates denticulataPseudovates gracilicollisPseudovates hofmanni Pseudovates iheringiPseudovates longicollis Pseudovates minorPseudovates paraensisPseudovates parallela 
Pseudovates parvula 
Pseudovates spinicollis 
Pseudovates stolli
Pseudovates tolteca 
Pseudovates townsendi
Pseudovates tripunctata

Genus Pseudoxyops
Pseudoxyops boliviana
Pseudoxyops borellii
Pseudoxyops diluta
Pseudoxyops minuta
Pseudoxyops perpulchra

Genus Pseudoxypilus
Pseudoxypilus hemerobius

Genus Pseudoyersinia
Pseudoyersinia andreae 
Pseudoyersinia betancuriae 
Pseudoyersinia brevipennis 
Pseudoyersinia canariensis 
Pseudoyersinia inaspectata 
Pseudoyersinia kabilica 
Pseudoyersinia lagrecai 
Pseudoyersinia occidentalis 
Pseudoyersinia paui 
Pseudoyersinia pilipes 
Pseudoyersinia salvinae 
Pseudoyersinia subaptera 
Pseudoyersinia teydeana

Genus Psychomantis
Psychomantis borneensis
Psychomantis malayensis

Genus Pyrgomantis

Pyrgomantis bisignata
Pyrgomantis congica
Pyrgomantis curta
Pyrgomantis fasciata
Pyrgomantis jonesi
Pyrgomantis longissima
Pyrgomantis mabuia
Pyrgomantis mitrata
Pyrgomantis nana
Pyrgomantis nasuta
Pyrgomantis ornatipes
Pyrgomantis pallida
Pyrgomantis rhodesica
Pyrgomantis runifera
Pyrgomantis signatifrons
Pyrgomantis simillima
Pyrgomantis singularis
Pyrgomantis wellmanni

Genus Raptrix
Raptrix intermedia
Raptrix occidentalis
Raptrix perspicua  
Raptrix westwoodi

Genus Rhachimantis
Rhachimantis carinata

Genus Rhodomantis
Rhodomantis disparilis
Rhodomantis helenae
Rhodomantis kimberley
Rhodomantis macula
Rhodomantis microptera
Rhodomantis mitchell
Rhodomantis napier
Rhodomantis queenslandica
Rhodomantis rentzi

Genus Rhomantis
Rhomantis moultoni

Genus Rhombodera
Rhombodera is a large genus of shield mantises.
Rhombodera basalis (giant Malaysian shield mantis)
Rhombodera boschmai
Rhombodera brachynota
Rhombodera crassa
Rhombodera doriana
Rhombodera extensicollis (giant shield mantis)
Rhombodera extraordinaria
Rhombodera fratricida
Rhombodera handschini
Rhombodera javana
Rhombodera keiana
Rhombodera kirbyi
Rhombodera laticollis
Rhombodera latipronotum
Rhombodera lingulata
Rhombodera megaera (giant shield mantis)
Rhombodera mjoebergi
Rhombodera morokana
Rhombodera ornatipes
Rhombodera palawanensis
Rhombodera papuana
Rhombodera rennellana
Rhombodera rollei
Rhombodera sjoestedti
Rhombodera stalii
Rhombodera taprobana
Rhombodera titania
Rhombodera valida
Rhombodera zhangi

Genus Rhomboderella
Rhomboderella gabonica
Rhomboderella parmata
Rhomboderella scutata
Rhomboderella thorectes

Genus Rhombomantis
 Rhombomantis butleri
 Rhombomantis fusca
 Rhombomantis tectiformis
 Rhombomantis woodmasoni

Genus Rivetina
Rivetina is a genus containing species of ground mantis.
Rivetina asiatica
Rivetina baetica (ground mantis)
Rivetina balcanica
Rivetina beybienkoi
Rivetina buettikeri
Rivetina byblica
Rivetina caucasica
Rivetina compacta
Rivetina crassa
Rivetina dentata
Rivetina deserta
Rivetina dolichoptera
Rivetina elegans
Rivetina excellens
Rivetina fasciata
Rivetina feisabadica
Rivetina gigantea
Rivetina gigas
Rivetina grandis
Rivetina inermis
Rivetina iranica
Rivetina karadumi
Rivetina karateginica
Rivetina laticollis
Rivetina monticola
Rivetina nana
Rivetina pallida
Rivetina parva
Rivetina pulisangini
Rivetina rhombicollis
Rivetina similis
Rivetina syriaca
Rivetina tarda
Rivetina varsobica

Genus Rivetinula
Rivetinula fraterna

Genus Sceptuchus
Sceptuchus baehri
Sceptuchus simplex

Genus Schizocephala
Schizocephala bicornis

Genus Scolodera
Scolodera pardalotus

Genus Severinia
Severinia granulata
Severinia lemoroi
Severinia mistshenkoi
Severinia nigrofasciata
Severinia obscurus
Severinia popovi
Severinia turcomaniae
Severinia ullrichi

Genus Sibylla
Sibylla dives 
Sibylla dolosa 
Sibylla gratiosa 
Sibylla griffinii 
Sibylla limbata
Sibylla maculosa 
Sibylla marmorata
Sibylla operosa
Sibylla pannulata 
Sibylla polyacantha
Sibylla pretiosa (cryptic mantis, lichen mantis)
Sibylla punctata 
Sibylla vanderplaetseni

Genus Sinaiella
Sinaiella nebulosa
Sinaiella raggei
Sinaiella sabulosa

Genus Sinomantis
Sinomantis denticulata

Genus Sinomiopteryx
Sinomiopteryx brevifrons
Sinomiopteryx grahami
Sinomiopteryx guangxiensis

Genus Solygia
Solygia sulcatifrons

Genus Somalithespis
Somalithespis minor

Genus Sphaeromantis
Sphaeromantis spinicollis
Sphaeromantis spinulosa

Genus Sphodromantis

Sphodromantis is a large genus of mantises concentrated in Africa. Outside their range, many share the name African mantis.
Sphodromantis abessinica
Sphodromantis aethiopica
Sphodromantis annobonensis
Sphodromantis aurea (Congo green mantis)
Sphodromantis aureoides
Sphodromantis baccettii
Sphodromantis balachowskyi (African mantis)
Sphodromantis biocellata
Sphodromantis centralis (African mantis, Central African mantis)
Sphodromantis citernii
Sphodromantis congica
Sphodromantis conspicua
Sphodromantis elegans
Sphodromantis elongata
Sphodromantis fenestrata
Sphodromantis gastrica (common green mantis)
Sphodromantis gestri
Sphodromantis giubana
Sphodromantis gracilicollis
Sphodromantis gracilis
Sphodromantis hyalina
Sphodromantis kersteni
Sphodromantis lagrecai
Sphodromantis lineola (African mantis, African lined mantis)
Sphodromantis obscura
Sphodromantis pachinota
Sphodromantis pardii
Sphodromantis pavonina
Sphodromantis pupillata
Sphodromantis royi
Sphodromantis rubrostigma
Sphodromantis rudolfae
Sphodromantis socotrana
Sphodromantis splendida
Sphodromantis stigmosa
Sphodromantis tenuidentata
Sphodromantis viridis (giant African mantis, bush mantis)
Sphodromantis werneri

Genus Sphodropoda
Sphodropoda lepida
Sphodropoda quinquedens
Sphodropoda tristis (burying mantis)
Sphodropoda viridis

Genus Spilomantis
Spilomantis nigripes
Spilomantis occipitalis

Genus Stagmatoptera
Stagmatoptera abdominalis
Stagmatoptera binotata
Stagmatoptera biocellata
Stagmatoptera cerdai
Stagmatoptera diana 
Stagmatoptera femoralis
Stagmatoptera hyaloptera (Argentine white crested mantis)
Stagmatoptera indicator
Stagmatoptera luna
Stagmatoptera pia
Stagmatoptera precaria
Stagmatoptera reimoseri
Stagmatoptera septentrionalis
Stagmatoptera supplicaria ]

Genus Stagmomantis

The range of Stagmomantis species includes North America, Central America, and South America.
Stagmomantis californica (California mantis)
Stagmomantis carolina (Carolina mantis)
Stagmomantis coerulans
Stagmomantis colorata
Stagmomantis costalis
Stagmomantis domingensis
Stagmomantis floridensis (larger Florida mantis)
Stagmomantis fraterna
Stagmomantis gracilipes (Arizona tan mantis)
Stagmomantis hebardi
Stagmomantis limbata (bordered mantis, Arizona mantis)
Stagmomantis marginata
Stagmomantis maya
Stagmomantis montana
Stagmomantis nahua
Stagmomantis pagana
Stagmomantis parvidentata 
Stagmomantis theophila
Stagmomantis tolteca
Stagmomantis venusta
Stagmomantis vicina

Genus Statilia

Statilia agresta
Statilia apicalis
Statilia chayuensis
Statilia flavobrunnea
Statilia maculata (Japanese "ko-kamakiri" i.e. small mantis)
Statilia major
Statilia nemoralis
Statilia nobilis
Statilia occibivittata
Statilia ocellata
Statilia pallida
Statilia spanis
Statilia viridibrunnea

Genus Stenomantis
Stenomantis novaeguineae

Genus Stenophylla

Stenophylla cornigera
Stenophylla gallardi
Stenophylla lobivertex

Genus Stenopyga
Stenopyga belinga
Stenopyga casta
Stenopyga extera
Stenopyga ipassa
Stenopyga orientalis
Stenopyga reticulata
Stenopyga tenera
Stenopyga usambarica
Stenopyga ziela

Genus Stenotoxodera
Stenotoxodera pluto
Stenotoxodera porioni

Genus Stictomantis
Stictomantis cinctipes

Genus Tagalomantis
Tagalomantis brevis
Tagalomantis manillensis

Genus Tamolanica
This is another genus with species sometimes called shield mantises.
Tamolanica andaina
Tamolanica atricoxis
Tamolanica decipiens
Tamolanica denticulata
Tamolanica dilena
Tamolanica katauana
Tamolanica leopoldi
Tamolanica pectoralis
Tamolanica phryne
Tamolanica tamolana (New Guinea shield mantis)

Genus Taumantis
Taumantis cephalotes
Taumantis globiceps
Taumantis sigiana (lime mantis)

Genus Tauromantis
Tauromantis championi

Genus Tarachina
Tarachina brevipennis
Tarachina congica
Tarachina constricta
Tarachina occidentalis
Tarachina rammei
Tarachina raphidioides
Tarachina schultzei
Tarachina seriepunctata
Tarachina transvaalensis
Tarachina werneri
Tarachina zernyi

Genus Tarachodella
Tarachodella monticola

Genus Tarachodes
Members of this genus may be called bark mantises or ground mantises.
Tarachodes abyssinicus
Tarachodes aestuans
Tarachodes afzelii (Tanzanian ground mantis)
Tarachodes alluaudi
Tarachodes arabicus
Tarachodes basinotatus
Tarachodes beieri
Tarachodes betakarschi
Tarachodes bicornis (two-horned mantis)
Tarachodes bispinosus
Tarachodes brevipennis
Tarachodes chopardi
Tarachodes circulifer
Tarachodes circuliferoides
Tarachodes davidi
Tarachodes dissimulator
Tarachodes dives
Tarachodes feae
Tarachodes fraterculus
Tarachodes fuscipennis
Tarachodes gerstaeckeri
Tarachodes gibber
Tarachodes gigas
Tarachodes gilvus
Tarachodes griseus
Tarachodes haedus
Tarachodes insidiator
Tarachodes karschi
Tarachodes lucubrans
Tarachodes maculisternum
Tarachodes maurus
Tarachodes minor
Tarachodes modesta
Tarachodes monstrosus
Tarachodes namibiensis
Tarachodes natalensis
Tarachodes nubifer
Tarachodes nyassanus
Tarachodes obscuripennis
Tarachodes obtusiceps
Tarachodes okahandyanus
Tarachodes oxynotus
Tarachodes perloides
Tarachodes pilosipes
Tarachodes pujoli
Tarachodes rhodesicus
Tarachodes robustus
Tarachodes rotundiceps
Tarachodes sanctus
Tarachodes saussurei
Tarachodes schulthessi
Tarachodes severini
Tarachodes similis
Tarachodes sjostedti
Tarachodes smithi
Tarachodes taboranus
Tarachodes tananus
Tarachodes taramassi
Tarachodes ugandensis
Tarachodes usambaricus
Tarachodes vitreus
Tarachodes werneri

Genus Tarachodula
Tarachodula ornata
Tarachodula pantherina

Genus Tarachomantis
Tarachomantis alaotrana
Tarachomantis analamazoatra
Tarachomantis betanimena
Tarachomantis betsilea
Tarachomantis caldwelli
Tarachomantis confusa
Tarachomantis hova
Tarachomantis macula
Tarachomantis marojeziensis
Tarachomantis rubiginosa
Tarachomantis sakalava
Tarachomantis sogai
Tarachomantis tsaratanana

Genus Teddia
Teddia dioscoris

Genus Telomantis
Telomantis lamperti
Telomantis robusta

Genus Tenodera

Species of the genus Tenodera are found in Asia, Africa, Australia and North America.
Tenodera acuticauda 
Tenodera angustipennis (narrow-winged mantis)
Tenodera aridifolia 
Tenodera australasiae (purple-winged mantis)
Tenodera caudafissilis 
Tenodera chloreudeta 
Tenodera costalis 
Tenodera fasciata 
Tenodera intermedia 
Tenodera iringana 
Tenodera parasinensis 
Tenodera philippina 
Tenodera rungsi 
Tenodera sinensis (Chinese mantis)
Tenodera stotzneri 
Tenodera superstitiosa

Genus Tenospilota
Tenospilota nova

Genus Theopompa
These species are sometimes known as the Asian bark mantises.
Theopompa borneana
Theopompa burmeisteri
Theopompa ophthalmica
Theopompa servillei
Theopompa tosta

Genus Theopompella
Theopompella aurivillii
Theopompella chopardi
Theopompella congica
Theopompella elegans
Theopompella fusca
Theopompella heterochroa
Theopompella orientalis
Theopompella pallida
Theopompella westwoodi

Genus Theopropus
Boxer mantis and flower mantis are among the common names used for members of this genus.
Theopropus borneensis
Theopropus cattulus
Theopropus elegans (banded flower mantis, Asian boxer mantis)
Theopropus rubrobrunneus

Genus Thespis
Thespis bicolor
Thespis dissimilis
Thespis exposita
Thespis major
Thespis media
Thespis metae
Thespis parva

Genus Thesprotia
This genus is sometimes called American grass mantises.

Thesprotia brasiliensis
Thesprotia brevis
Thesprotia caribea
Thesprotia filum
Thesprotia fuscipennis
Thesprotia gigas
Thesprotia graminis (American grass mantis)
Thesprotia infumata
Thesprotia insolita
Thesprotia macilenta
Thesprotia maculata
Thesprotia pellucida
Thesprotia simplex
Thesprotia subhyalina

Genus Thesprotiella

Thesprotiella bicorniculata
Thesprotiella festae
Thesprotiella fronticornis
Thesprotiella peruana
Thesprotiella similis

Genus Thrinaconyx

Thrinaconyx fumosus
Thrinaconyx kirschianus
Thrinaconyx sialidea

Genus Tisma
Tisma acutipennis
Tisma chopardi
Tisma freyi
Tisma grandidieri
Tisma pauliani
Tisma peyrierasi

Genus Tismomorpha
Tismomorpha cherlonneixi
Tismomorpha inexpectata
Tismomorpha reinhardi
Tismomorpha vitripennis

Genus Titanodula
Titanodula attenboroughi
Titanodula formosana
Titanodula fruhstorferi
Titanodula grandis

Genus Tithrone
Tithrone laeta
Tithrone latipennis
Tithrone roseipennis

Genus Toxodanuria
Toxodanuria orientalis
Toxodanuria parvula

Genus Toxodera
Toxodera beieri
Toxodera denticulata
Toxodera fimbriata
Toxodera hauseri
Toxodera integrifolia
Toxodera maculata
Toxodera maxima
Toxodera pfanneri

Genus Toxoderella
Toxoderella fortnumi

Genus Toxoderopsis
Toxoderopsis spinigera
Toxoderopsis taurus

Genus Toxomantis
Toxomantis sinensis
Toxomantis westwoodi

Genus Trachymantis
Trachymantis dentifrons
Trachymantis obesa

Genus Tricondylomimus
Tricondylomimus coomani
Tricondylomimus intermedius
Tricondylomimus mirabilis

Genus Tropidomantis
Tropidomantis gressitti
Tropidomantis kawaharai
Tropidomantis tenera

Genus Tuberculepsus
Tuberculepsus ambrensis
Tuberculepsus analabensis
Tuberculepsus andriai
Tuberculepsus beieri
Tuberculepsus masoalensis
Tuberculepsus nigricoxa
Tuberculepsus orangea
Tuberculepsus tuberculatus

Genus Tylomantis
Tylomantis armillata
Tylomantis fuliginosa

Genus Vates
Vates amazonica
Vates biplagiata
Vates boliviana
Vates chopardi
Vates festae
Vates foliata
Vates lobata
Vates luxuriosa
Vates pectinata
Vates pectinicornis
Vates peruviana
Vates serraticornis
Vates weyrauchi

Genus Velox
Velox wielandi

Genus Vespamantoida
Vespamantoida toulgoeti
Vespamantoida wherleyi

Genus †Vitimiphotina
†Vitimiphotina corrugata

Genus Werneriana
Werneriana latipennis

Genus Xystropeltis
Xystropeltis lankesteri
Xystropeltis meridionalis
Xystropeltis quadrilobata

Genus Yersinia
Yersinia mexicana

Genus Yersiniops
Members of this genus are commonly called ground mantises. Genus Pseudoyersinia is similar.
Yersiniops newboldi
Yersiniops solitaria (horned ground mantis)
Yersiniops sophronica (Yersin's ground mantis)

Genus Zoolea 

Some members of this genus go by the common name unicorn mantis.
Zoolea descampsi
Zoolea lobipes
Zoolea major
Zoolea minor
Zoolea orba

Genus Zopheromantis 
Zopheromantis loripes

Genus Zouza 
Zouza radiosa

Families
According to most recent taxonomy, all genera of mantis now belong to one of the following families:
 Extinct taxa 
 †Un-named mantis family
 †Baissomantidae
 †Cretomantidae
 †Santanmantidae Grimaldi, 2003
 Extant taxa (suborder Eumantodea)
 Infraorder Schizomantodea
 Subinfraordinal group Artimantodea
 Superfamily group Amerimantodea
 Superfamily Acanthopoidea
 Family Acanthopidae
 Family Angelidae
 Family Coptopterygidae
 Family Liturgusidae
 Family Photinaidae
 Superfamily Thespoidea
 Family Thespidae
 Superfamily group Cernomantodea
 Superfamily Chroicopteroidea
 Family Chroicopteridae
 Superfamily Epaphroditoidea
 Family Epaphroditidae
 Family Majangidae
 Superfamily Eremiaphiloidea
 Family Amelidae
 Family Eremiaphilidae
 Family Rivetinidae
 Family Toxoderidae
 Superfamily Galinthiadoidea
 Family Galinthiadidae
 Superfamily Gonypetoidea
 Family Gonypetidae
 Superfamily Haanioidea
 Family Haaniidae
 Superfamily Hoplocoryphoidea
 Family Hoplocoryphidae
 Superfamily Hymenopooidea
 Family Empusidae
 Family Hymenopodidae
 Superfamily Mantoidea
 Family Dactylopterygidae
 Family Deroplatyidae
 Family Mantidae
 Superfamily Miomantoidea
 Family Miomantidae
 Superfamily Nanomantoidea
 Family Amorphoscelidae
 Family Leptomantellidae
 Family Nanomantidae
 Superfamily Metallyticoidea
 Family Metallyticidae
 Infraorder Spinomantodea
 Superfamily Mantoidoidea
 Family Mantoididae
 Superfamily Chaeteessoidea
 Family Chaeteessidae

See also
Bark mantis
Boxer mantis
Dead leaf mantis
Flower mantis
Grass mantis
Ground mantis
Leaf mantis
Shield mantis
Stick mantis

References